Exodeconus miersii is a species of flowering plant in the Solanaceae (nightshade) family that is endemic to the Galapagos Islands.

Description
Exodeconus miersii is a creeping plant with large, hairy light green leaves that form a dense ground cover. It has large white trumpet-shaped flowers.

Range and habitat
Exodeconus miersii is present widely on the Galapagos Islands, where it grows on rocks and sandy soils.

Taxonomy

References

Solanaceae
Flora of the Galápagos Islands